The Executive Council of the Free State is the cabinet of the executive branch of the provincial government in the South African province of the Free State. The Members of the Executive Council (MECs) are appointed from among the members of the Free State Provincial Legislature by the Premier of the Free State, an office held since March 2018 by Sisi Ntombela of the African National Congress (ANC).

Direko premiership: 1999–2004 

Winkie Direko was elected as the Free State's third Premier in the 1999 general election. She reshuffled her Executive Council on 28 June 2001, firing three MECs: Tate Makgoe, Anna Buthelezi-Phori, and Casca Mokitlane.

Marshoff premiership: 2004–2009 

Beatrice Marshoff was elected Premier in the 2004 general elections; her new Executive Council was sworn in on 3 May 2004. In April 2005, over the course of two weeks, Marshoff announced two wide-ranging reshuffles in which three MECs – Ace Magashule, Itumeleng Benny Kotsoane, and Benny Malakoane – were sacked and others changed portfolios. In August 2007, in another reshuffle, Magashule was returned to the cabinet and another MEC, Playfair Morule, was removed; several other MECs also changed portfolios. 

In January 2008, Mxolisi Dukwana was appointed as MEC for Public Safety and Security and Mamiki Qabathe was appointed MEC for Agriculture. In October that year, both changed portfolios, along with two other MECs, in a reshuffle affecting four portfolios but involving no sackings. In February 2009, Dukwana additionally took on, in an acting capacity, the education portfolio, after Education MEC Casca Mokitlane resigned and defected from the ANC ahead of the 2009 general election.

Magashule premiership

First term: 2009–2014 
On 11 May 2009, following his election as Premier in the 2009 general election, Ace Magashule announced his new Executive Council, which included six new appointments; in addition, the names of four departments were changed. In February 2011, Magashule announced a reshuffle in which four MECs changed portfolios and in which responsibility for rural development was moved from the public works portfolio to the agriculture portfolio. In June of that year, he appointed Butana Komphela to replace Thabo Manyoni as MEC for Police, Roads and Transport; Manyoni had left the provincial government to become Mayor of Mangaung.

Magashule effected two further reshuffles before the end of the provincial legislature's term. In February 2012, he fired Economic Development MEC Mxolisi Dukwana and replaced him with Mamiki Qabathe; Olly Mlamleli was appointed to the Executive Council to take over Qabathe's former portfolio. In March 2013, Magashule fired Finance MEC Seiso Mohai, replacing him with Elzabe Rockman, and appointed Benny Malakoane to fill the vacancy in the health portfolio that had arisen after Fezi Ngumbentombi's death in December 2012; Qabathe also swopped portfolios with Msebenzi Zwane.

Second term: 2014–2018 
Pursuant to his re-election in the 2014 general election, Magashule announced his new Executive Council on 29 May 2014. He made only limited changes, replacing Dan Kgothule with Mathabo Leeto as MEC for Sports, Arts, Culture and Recreation and replacing Sisi Mabe, who became Speaker of the provincial legislature, with Sam Mashinini as MEC for Public Works. He also added small business development to Msebenzi Zwane's economic development portfolio. 

In May 2015, Magashule announced the first reshuffle of his second term, occasioned by the departure of Mamiki Qabathe, who succeeded Mabe as Speaker. In September 2015, Zwane, who had replaced Qabathe in the agriculture portfolio in the May reshuffle, was sworn into the National Assembly to become national Minister of Mineral Resources; he was replaced in the Executive Council by Oupa Khoabane. In October the following year, Magashule announced a wide-ranging reshuffle, occasioned by the departure of Mlamleli, who had been elected Mayor of Mangaung in the local government elections in August; Limakatso Mahasa was the only new appointment made, although the reshuffle affected five portfolios.

Ntombela premiership

First term: 2018–2019 
Sisi Ntombela was sworn in as Premier in March 2018; she succeeded Ace Magashule, who had resigned to take up the position of ANC Secretary-General. Although she initially retained all of Magashule's MECs, she announced a reshuffle on 9 May 2018. Five portfolios were affected, but no MECs were fired; indeed, because Ntombela's promotion had left a vacancy in the Executive Council, one new MEC, Montseng Tsiu, was appointed. In the same reshuffle, responsibility for human settlements was transferred from the cooperative governance and traditional affairs portfolio to Dorah Coetzee's public works and infrastructure portfolio.

Second term: 2019–2023 
Ntombela was elected to a full term as Premier in the 2019 general election and she announced her new Executive Council in late May. On 1 October 2021, she announced a reshuffle affecting three portfolios, in which Sam Mashinini was fired. She resigned as premier in February 2023.

Dukwana premiership: 2023–present
On 14 March 2023, Dukwana appointed his Executive Council.

See also 

 Template: Free State Executive Council
 Government of South Africa
 Constitution of South Africa
 Orange Free State

References 

Government of the Free State (province)